Vice Admiral Sanjay Vatsayan, AVSM, NM is a serving Flag officer in the Indian Navy. He currently serves as the Chief of Staff, Eastern Naval Command. Previously, he served as the Deputy Commandant of the National Defence Academy. He earlier served as the Assistant Chief of Naval Staff (Policy & Plans), and as the Flag Officer Commanding Eastern Fleet.

Early life and education
Vatsayan graduated from the National Defence Academy, Pune in 1986.

Naval career 
Vatsayan was commissioned into the Indian Navy on 1 January 1988. He is a specialist in Gunnery and missile systems. He has completed the staff course at the Defence Services Staff College in Wellington Cantonment in 2003 and the higher command course at the Naval War College, Goa in 2010. He has also attended the National Defence College, New Delhi in 2014.

He has served on the Samar-class offshore patrol vessel ICGS Sangram, ICGS C05 and was part of the commissioning crew of the Delhi-class Guided missile destroyer.

He was also the Commissioning Commanding Officer of the indigenously-built Shivalik-class Guided missile frigate .

Vatsayan, in his staff appointments, has served as the Joint Director of Personnel, Director of Personnel (Policy). He also served as the Director Naval Plans (Perspective Planning) and the Principal Director Naval Plans, all at Naval HQ.

Flag rank
On promotion to Flag Rank, Vatsayan took over as the Assistant Chief of Naval Staff (Policy and Plans). On 10 February 2020, he assumed the office of the Flag Officer Commanding Eastern Fleet, taking over from Rear Admiral Suraj Berry who commanded the Eastern Fleet from 2019 to 2020. For his command of the eastern fleet, on 26 January 2021, he was awarded the Ati Vishisht Seva Medal. 

In February 2021, he relinquished command of the Eastern Fleet to Rear Admiral Tarun Sobti and was appointed Deputy Commandant of the NDA.

Awards and decorations

See also
 Flag Officer Commanding Eastern Fleet
 Eastern Fleet

References 

Indian Navy admirals
Flag Officers Commanding Eastern Fleet
National Defence Academy (India) alumni
Living people
Year of birth missing (living people)
National Defence College, India alumni
Recipients of the Ati Vishisht Seva Medal
Recipients of the Nau Sena Medal
Naval War College, Goa alumni
Defence Services Staff College alumni